Mark 27 may refer to:
 Mark 27, a variant of the 3-inch/50-caliber gun
 Mark 27 torpedo, 1940s United States Navy submarine-launched torpedo
 Mark 27 nuclear bomb, 1950s United States nuclear weapon design
 MK 27, a variant of the Medium Tactical Vehicle Replacement
 MK 27, a variant of the Glock 19 adopted by the US military